Carme Pigem Barceló (born Olot, 8 April 1962) is a Spanish architect, a member of the Pritzker Prize-winning architectural firm RCR Arquitectes, together with Ramón Vilalta and Rafael Aranda.

Biography 

Between 1977 and 1979, she studied at the School of Fine arts of Olot, and in 1987 graduated in architecture at ETSA Vallés. In 1987 she founded RCR Arquitectes together with Ramón Vilalta and Rafael Aranda.

Between 1992 and 1999 she worked as professor of Architectural Projects at ETSA Vallés and was a member of the board of examiners for the final examinations from 1995 to 2004. From 1997 to 2003 she was professor of Architectural Projects at the ETSAB and a member of the board of examiners in 2003. Since 2005 she has been a visiting professor in the Department of Architecture at the Zurich Institute of Technology (ETHZ), Switzerland.

She was awarded the 2017 Pritzker Prize together with Ramón Vilalta and Rafael Aranda.

In June 2020, she and other architects, as well as chefs, Nobel laureates in Economics and leaders of international organizations, signed the appeal in favour of the purple economy (“Towards a cultural renaissance of the economy”), published in Corriere della Sera, El País and Le Monde.

References

Spanish women architects
20th-century Catalan architects
21st-century Spanish architects
1962 births
Living people
Academic staff of ETH Zurich
20th-century Spanish women
People from Olot
Escola d'Art i Superior de Disseny d'Olot alumni